The First Collier Ministry was the 16th Ministry of the Government of Western Australia and was led by Labor Premier Philip Collier. It succeeded the First Mitchell Ministry on 16 April 1924, following the defeat of the Nationalist government at the 1924 election on 22 March.

The ministry was followed by the Second Mitchell Ministry on 23 April 1930 after the Labor Party lost government at the state election held on 26 March.

First Ministry
The following ministers served until the reconstitution of the Ministry on 30 April 1927, following the 1927 state election:

Second Ministry
The following ministers served from their appointment on 30 April 1927 until the end of the Ministry on 23 April 1930, following the 1930 state election:

References

  (no ISBN)

Collier 1
Australian Labor Party ministries in Western Australia
Ministries of George V